An unidentified flying object (UFO) is any perceived aerial phenomenon that cannot be immediately identified or explained. On investigation, most UFOs are identified as known objects or atmospheric phenomena, while a small number remain unexplained.

Scientists and skeptic organizations such as the Committee for Skeptical Inquiry have provided prosaic explanations for a large number of claimed UFOs being caused by natural phenomena, human technology, delusions, or hoaxes. Small but vocal groups of ufologists favour unconventional, pseudoscientific hypotheses, often claiming that UFOs are evidence of extraterrestrial intelligence. Beliefs surrounding UFOs have inspired parts of new religions.

While unusual sightings have been reported in the sky throughout history, UFOs became culturally prominent after World War II, escalating during the Space Age. The 20th century saw studies and investigations into UFO reports conducted by governments (such as Project Blue Book in the United States and Project Condign in the United Kingdom), as well as by organisations and individuals.

History

Early history before the 20th century

People have observed the sky throughout history, and have sometimes seen unusual sights, such as comets, bright meteors, one or more of the five planets that can be readily seen with the naked eye, planetary conjunctions, and atmospheric optical phenomena such as parhelia and lenticular clouds. One particularly famous example is Halley's Comet: this was recorded first by Chinese astronomers in 240 BC and possibly as early as 467 BC. As it reaches the inner solar system every 76 years, it was often identified as a unique isolated event in ancient historical documents whose authors were unaware that it was a repeating phenomenon. Such accounts in history often were treated as supernatural portents, angels, or other religious omens. While UFO enthusiasts have sometimes commented on the narrative similarities between certain religious symbols in medieval paintings and UFO reports, the canonical and symbolic character of such images is documented by art historians placing more conventional religious interpretations on such images.

Some examples of pre-modern observations of unusual aerial phenomena:

 Julius Obsequens was a Roman writer who is believed to have lived in the middle of the fourth century AD. The only work associated with his name is the Liber de prodigiis (Book of Prodigies), completely extracted from an epitome, or abridgment, written by Livy; De prodigiis was constructed as an account of the wonders and portents that occurred in Rome between 249 and 12 BCE. An aspect of Obsequens' work that has inspired excitement in some UFO enthusiasts is that he makes reference to things moving through the sky. It is possible that it is a description of meteors, and, since Obsequens is writing some 400 years after the events he describes, the text is not an eyewitness account.
 A woodcut by Hans Glaser that appeared in a broadsheet in 1561 has been featured in popular culture as "celestial phenomenon over Nuremberg" and connected to various ancient astronaut claims. According to writer Jason Colavito, the image represents "a secondhand depiction of a particularly gaudy sundog", a known atmospheric optical phenomenon. A similar report comes from 1566 over Basel and, indeed, in the 15th and 16th centuries, many leaflets wrote of "miracles" and "sky spectacles".
 On January 25, 1878, the Denison Daily News printed an article in which John Martin, a local farmer, had reported seeing a large, dark, circular object resembling a balloon flying "at wonderful speed". Martin, according to the newspaper account, said it appeared to be about the size of a saucer from his perspective, one of the first uses of the word "saucer" in association with a UFO. In April of that year, reports of such "mystery airships" in various parts of the United States are reminiscent of modern UFO waves. Scores of people even reported talking to the pilots. Reports of strange ships and artificial lights in the sky were published in local newspapers for the next two decades culminating in a mass panic in 1897 where some people feared that Thomas Edison had created an artificial star that could fly around the country. When asked his opinion of such reports, Edison said, "You can take it from me that it is a pure fake."

20th century and after

In the Pacific and European theatres during World War II, round, glowing fireballs known as "foo fighters" were reported by Allied and Axis pilots. Some proposed Allied explanations at the time included St. Elmo's fire, the planet Venus, hallucinations from oxygen deprivation, or German secret weapons. In 1946, more than 2,000 reports were collected, primarily by the Swedish military, of unidentified aerial objects over the Scandinavian nations, along with isolated reports from France, Portugal, Spain, Italy, and Greece. The objects were referred to as "Russian hail" (and later as "ghost rockets") because it was thought the mysterious objects were possibly Russian tests of captured German V1 or V2 rockets. Most were identified as natural phenomena as meteors.

The popular UFO craze by many accounts began with a media frenzy surrounding the reports on June 24, 1947, that a civilian pilot named Kenneth Arnold reported seeing nine objects flying in formation near Mount Rainier in the United States. At the time, he claimed he described the objects flying in a saucer-like fashion, leading to newspaper accounts of "flying saucers" and "flying discs". Soon, reports of flying saucer sightings became a daily occurrence with one particularly famous example being the Roswell incident where remnants of a downed observation balloon were recovered by a farmer and confiscated by military personnel. 

The story received scant attention at the time, but interest in it revived in the 1990s with the publicity surrounding the television broadcast of an Alien autopsy video marketed as "real footage" but later admitted to be a staged "re-enactment". Various UFO claimants said that they had interacted with the aliens driving the spacecraft and a few said they had visited the crafts themselves. In 1961, the first alien abduction account was sensationalized when Barney and Betty Hill went under hypnosis after seeing a UFO and reported recovered memories of their experience that became ever more elaborate as the years went by.

As media accounts and speculation were running rampant in the US, by 1953 intelligence officials (Robertson Panel) worried that "genuine incursions" by enemy aircraft "over U.S. territory could be lost in a maelstrom of kooky hallucination" of UFO reports. Media were enlisted to help debunk and discourage UFO reports, culminating in a 1966 TV special, “UFO: Friend, Foe or Fantasy?”, in which Walter Cronkite "patiently" explained to viewers that UFOs were fantasy. Cronkite enlisted Carl Sagan and J. Allen Hynek, who told Cronkite, “To this time, there is no valid scientific proof that we have been visited by spaceships". Fellow NICAP official Donald E. Keyhoe wrote that Vice Admiral Roscoe Hillenkoetter, the first director of the CIA, "wanted public disclosure of UFO evidence".

A 1969 National Academy of Sciences panel reviewed the Condon Report and concurred with its finding, observing that, “While further study of particular aspects of the topic (e.g., atmospheric phenomena) may be useful, a study of UFOs in general is not a promising way to expand scientific understanding of the phenomena.” Referencing the panel's conclusions, the Pentagon announced that it would no longer investigate UFO reports. According to Keith Kloor, the "allure of flying saucers" remained popular with the public into the 1970s, spurring production of such sci-fi films, as Close Encounters of the Third Kind and Alien, which "continued to stoke public fascination". Kloor writes that by the late 1990s, "other big UFO subthemes had been prominently introduced into pop culture, such as the abduction phenomenon and government conspiracy narrative, via best-selling books and, of course, The X-Files".

Notable cases and incidents

Britain
 The Rendlesham Forest incident was a series of reported sightings of unexplained lights near Rendlesham Forest in Suffolk, England in late December 1980 which became linked with claims of UFO landings.

France

The most notable cases of UFO sightings in France include:
the Valensole UFO incident in 1965.
the Trans-en-Provence Case in 1981.

United States

 In the Kecksburg UFO incident, Pennsylvania (1965), residents reported seeing an object crash in the area. 
 In 1975, Travis Walton claimed to be abducted by aliens. The movie Fire in the Sky (1993) was based on this event, but greatly embellished the original account.
 The "Phoenix Lights" on March 13, 1997

Astronomer reports

The USAF's Project Blue Book files indicate that approximately 1% of all unknown reports came from amateur and professional astronomers or other telescope users (such as missile trackers or surveyors). In 1952, astronomer J. Allen Hynek, then a consultant to Blue Book, conducted a small survey of 45 fellow professional astronomers. Five reported UFO sightings (about 11%). In the 1970s, astrophysicist Peter A. Sturrock conducted two large surveys of the AIAA and American Astronomical Society (AAS). About 5% of the members polled indicated that they had had UFO sightings.

Astronomer Clyde Tombaugh, who saw six UFOs, including three green fireballs, supported the extraterrestrial hypothesis for UFOs and said scientists who dismissed it without study were "unscientific". Another astronomer, Lincoln LaPaz, headed the United States Air Force's investigation into green fireballs and other UFO phenomena in New Mexico. LaPaz reported two personal sightings, of a green fireball and a disc. (Both Tombaugh and LaPaz were part of Hynek's 1952 survey.) Hynek took two photos through the window of a commercial airliner of a disc that seemed to keep pace with his aircraft.

Astronomer Andrew Fraknoi rejected the hypothesis that UFOs are extraterrestrial spacecraft and responded to the "onslaught of credulous coverage" in books, films and entertainment by teaching his students to apply critical thinking to such claims, advising them that "being a good scientist is not unlike being a good detective". According to Fraknoi, UFO reports "might at first seem mysterious", but "the more you investigate, the more likely you are to find that there is LESS to these stories than meets the eye".

In a 1980 survey of 1800 members of amateur astronomer associations by Gert Helb and Hynek for CUFOS, 24% responded "yes" to the question "Have you ever observed an object which resisted your most exhaustive efforts at identification?"

Famous hoaxes

 The Maury Island incident
 George Adamski, over the space of two decades, made various claims about his meetings with telepathic aliens from nearby planets. He claimed photographs of the far side of the Moon taken by the Soviet lunar probe Luna 3 in 1959 were fake, and that there were cities, trees and snow-capped mountains on the far side of the Moon. Among copycats was a shadowy British figure named Cedric Allingham.
 Ed Walters, a building contractor, in 1987 allegedly perpetrated a hoax in Gulf Breeze, Florida. Walters claimed at first having seen a small UFO flying near his home and took some photographs of the craft. Walters reported and documented a series of UFO sightings over a period of three weeks and took several photographs. These sightings became famous, and are collectively referred to as the Gulf Breeze UFO incident. Three years later, in 1990, after the Walters family had moved, the new residents discovered a model of a UFO poorly hidden in the attic that bore an undeniable resemblance to the craft in Walters' photographs. Most investigators, like the forensic photo expert William G. Hyzer, now consider the sightings to be a hoax.

Terminology

The term "UFO" (or "UFOB") was coined in 1953 by the United States Air Force (USAF) to serve as a catch-all for all such reports. In its initial definition, the USAF stated that a "UFOB" was "any airborne object which by performance, aerodynamic characteristics, or unusual features, does not conform to any presently known aircraft or missile type, or which cannot be positively identified as a familiar object". Accordingly, the term was initially restricted to that fraction of cases which remained unidentified after investigation, as the USAF was interested in potential national security reasons and "technical aspects" (see Air Force Regulation 200-2).

During the late 1940s and through the 1950s, UFOs were often referred to popularly as "flying saucers" or "flying discs" due to the term being introduced in the context of the Kenneth Arnold incident. The Avro Canada VZ-9AV Avrocar was a concept vehicle produced during the 1950s, which was a functional aircraft with a saucer shape. UFOs were commonly referred to colloquially, as a "Bogey" by Western military personnel and pilots during the cold war. The term "bogey" was originally used to report anomalies in radar blips, to indicate possible hostile forces that might be roaming in the area.

The term UFO became more widespread during the 1950s, at first in technical literature, but later in popular use. UFOs garnered considerable interest during the Cold War, an era associated with a heightened concerns about national security, and, more recently, in the 2010s, for unexplained reasons. Nevertheless, various studies have concluded that the phenomenon does not represent a threat, and nor does it contain anything worthy of scientific pursuit (e.g., 1951 Flying Saucer Working Party, 1953 CIA Robertson Panel, USAF Project Blue Book, Condon Committee).

The Oxford English Dictionary defines a UFO as "An unidentified flying object; a 'flying saucer'". The first published book to use the word was authored by Donald E. Keyhoe.

As an acronym, "UFO" was coined by Captain Edward J. Ruppelt, who headed Project Blue Book, then the USAF's official investigation of UFOs. He wrote, "Obviously the term 'flying saucer' is misleading when applied to objects of every conceivable shape and performance. For this reason the military prefers the more general, if less colorful, name: unidentified flying objects. UFO (pronounced yoo-foe) for short." Other phrases that were used officially and that predate the UFO acronym include "flying flapjack", "flying disc", "unexplained flying discs", and "unidentifiable object".

In popular usage, the term UFO came to be used to refer to claims of alien spacecraft, and because of the public and media ridicule associated with the topic, some ufologists and investigators prefer to use terms such as "unidentified aerial phenomenon" (UAP) or "anomalous phenomena", as in the title of the National Aviation Reporting Center on Anomalous Phenomena (NARCAP). "Anomalous aerial vehicle" (AAV) or "unidentified aerial system" (UAS) are also sometimes used in a military aviation context to describe unidentified targets.
More recently, U.S. officials have adopted the term "unidentified anomalous phenomenon" (UAP).

Extraterrestrial hypothesis

While technically a UFO refers to any unidentified flying object, in modern popular culture the term UFO has generally become synonymous with alien spacecraft; however, the term ETV (extra-terrestrial vehicle) is sometimes used to separate this explanation of UFOs from totally earthbound explanations.

Investigations of reports

UFOs have been subject to investigations over the years that varied widely in scope and scientific rigor. Governments or independent academics in the United States, Canada, the United Kingdom, Japan, Peru, France, Belgium, Sweden, Brazil, Chile, Uruguay, Mexico, Spain, and the Soviet Union are known to have investigated UFO reports at various times. No official government investigation has ever publicly concluded that UFOs are indisputably real, physical objects, extraterrestrial in origin, or of concern to national defense.

Among the best known government studies are the ghost rockets investigation by the Swedish military (1946–1947), Project Blue Book, previously Project Sign and Project Grudge, conducted by the USAF from 1947 until 1969, the secret U.S. Army/Air Force Project Twinkle investigation into green fireballs (1948–1951), the secret USAF Project Blue Book Special Report No. 14 by the Battelle Memorial Institute, and the Brazilian Air Force's 1977 Operação Prato (Operation Saucer). France has had an ongoing investigation (GEPAN/SEPRA/GEIPAN) within its space agency Centre national d'études spatiales (CNES) since 1977; the government of Uruguay has had a similar investigation since 1989.

Prosaic explanations

Studies show that after careful investigation, the majority of UFOs can be identified as ordinary objects or phenomena. The most commonly found identified sources of UFO reports are:
 astronomical objects (bright stars, bolides, bright planets, and the Moon)
 aircraft (including military, civilian, and experimental aircraft as well as such peculiarities as aerial advertising, missile and other rocket launches, artificial satellites, re-entering spacecraft including space debris, kites, and various unmanned aerial vehicles often popularly termed "drones")
 balloons (surveillance balloons, toy balloons, weather balloons, large research balloons)
 other atmospheric objects and phenomena (birds, unusual clouds, flares)
 light phenomena (mirages, Fata Morgana, ball lightning, moon dogs, satellite flares, searchlights and other ground lights, etc.)
 psychological effects (pareidolia, suggestibility and false memories, mass psychogenic disorders, optical illusions, and hallucinations)
hoaxes

A 1952–1955 study by the Battelle Memorial Institute for the USAF included these categories. An individual 1979 study by CUFOS researcher Allan Hendry found, as did other investigations, that fewer than one percent of cases he investigated were hoaxes and most sightings were actually honest misidentifications of prosaic phenomena. Hendry attributed most of these to inexperience or misperception.

Americas

Brazil (1952–2016) 

On October 31, 2008, the National Archives of Brazil began receiving from the Aeronautical Documentation and History Center part of the documentation of the Brazilian Air Force regarding the investigation of the appearance of UFOs in Brazil. Currently, this collection gathers cases between 1952 and 2016.

Chile (c. 1968) 

In 1968, the SEFAA (previously CEFAA) began receiving case reports of the general public, civil aviators and the Chilean Air Force regarding the sightings or the appearance of UFOs in Chile, the initial work was an initiative of Sergio Bravo Flores who led the Chilean Committee for the Study of Unidentified Space Phenomena, supported even by the Chilean Scientific Society. Currently, the organization changed its denomination to SEFAA and its a department of the DGAC(Chile) which in turn depends on the Chilean Air Force.

Canada (c. 1950)

In Canada, the Department of National Defence has dealt with reports, sightings and investigations of UFOs across Canada. In addition to conducting investigations into crop circles in Duhamel, Alberta, it still considers "unsolved" the Falcon Lake incident in Manitoba and the Shag Harbour UFO incident in Nova Scotia.

Early Canadian studies included Project Magnet (1950–1954) and Project Second Storey (1952–1954), supported by the Defence Research Board.

United States

Synopsis
U.S. investigations into UFOs include:
 Project Blue Book, previously Project Sign and Project Grudge, conducted by the USAF from 1947 until 1969
 The secret U.S. Army/Air Force Project Twinkle investigation into green fireballs (1948–1951)
 Ghost rockets investigations by the Swedish, UK, U.S., and Greek militaries (1946–1947)
 The secret CIA Office of Scientific Investigation (OS/I) study (1952–53)
 The secret CIA Robertson Panel (1953)
 The secret USAF Project Blue Book Special Report No. 14 by the Battelle Memorial Institute (1951–1954)
 The Brookings Report (1960), commissioned by NASA
 The public Condon Committee (1966–1968)
 The private, internal RAND Corporation study (1968)
 The private Sturrock panel (1998)
 The secret Advanced Aviation Threat Identification Program which was funded from 2007 to 2012.
 The Unidentified Aerial Phenomena Task Force, a continuing program within the United States Office of Naval Intelligence which was acknowledged in 2017.

Thousands of documents released under FOIA also indicate that many U.S. intelligence agencies collected (and still collect) information on UFOs. These agencies include the Defense Intelligence Agency (DIA), FBI, CIA, National Security Agency (NSA), as well as military intelligence agencies of the Army and U.S. Navy, in addition to the Air Force.

The investigation of UFOs has also attracted many civilians, who in the U.S formed research groups such as NICAP (active 1956–1980), Aerial Phenomena Research Organization (APRO) (active 1952–1988), MUFON (active 1969–), and CUFOS (active 1973–).

On November 24, 2021, the Pentagon announced the formation of the Airborne Object Identification and Management Synchronization Group, a new intelligence group to investigate unidentified objects that may compromise the airspace of the United States.

USAAF and FBI response to the 1947 sightings

Following the large U.S. surge in sightings in June and early July 1947, on July 9, 1947, United States Army Air Forces (USAAF) intelligence, in cooperation with the FBI, began a formal investigation into selected sightings with characteristics that could not be immediately rationalized, such as Kenneth Arnold's. The USAAF used "all of its top scientists" to determine whether "such a phenomenon could, in fact, occur". The research was "being conducted with the thought that the flying objects might be a celestial phenomenon," or that "they might be a foreign body mechanically devised and controlled." Three weeks later in a preliminary defense estimate, the air force investigation decided that, "This 'flying saucer' situation is not all imaginary or seeing too much in some natural phenomenon. Something is really flying around."

A further review by the intelligence and technical divisions of the Air Materiel Command at Wright Field reached the same conclusion. It reported that "the phenomenon is something real and not visionary or fictitious," and there were disc-shaped objects, metallic in appearance, as big as man-made aircraft. They were characterized by "extreme rates of climb [and] maneuverability", general lack of noise, absence of a trail, occasional formation flying, and "evasive" behavior "when sighted or contacted by friendly aircraft and radar", suggesting a controlled craft. It was therefore recommended in late September 1947 that an official Air Force investigation be set up. It was also recommended that other government agencies should assist in the investigation.

USAF

Projects Sign (1947–1949), Grudge (1948–1951), and Blue Book (1951–1970) 

Project Sign's final report, published in early 1949, stated that while some UFOs appeared to represent actual aircraft, there was not enough data to determine their origin.

The Air Force's Project Sign was created at the end of 1947, and was one of the earliest government studies to come to a secret extraterrestrial conclusion. In August 1948, Sign investigators wrote a top-secret intelligence estimate to that effect, but the Air Force Chief of Staff Hoyt Vandenberg ordered it destroyed. The existence of this suppressed report was revealed by several insiders who had read it, such as astronomer and USAF consultant J. Allen Hynek and Capt. Edward J. Ruppelt, the first head of the USAF's Project Blue Book.

Another highly classified U.S. study was conducted by the CIA's Office of Scientific Investigation (OS/I) in the latter half of 1952 in response to orders from the National Security Council (NSC). This study concluded UFOs were real physical objects of potential threat to national security. One OS/I memo to the CIA Director (DCI) in December read that "the reports of incidents convince us that there is something going on that must have immediate attention ... Sightings of unexplained objects at great altitudes and traveling at high speeds in the vicinity of major U.S. defense installations are of such a nature that they are not attributable to natural phenomena or any known types of aerial vehicles."

The matter was considered so urgent that OS/I drafted a memorandum from the DCI to the NSC proposing that the NSC establish an investigation of UFOs as a priority project throughout the intelligence and the defense research and development community. It also urged the DCI to establish an external research project of top-level scientists, now known as the Robertson Panel to analyze the problem of UFOs. The OS/I investigation was called off after the Robertson Panel's negative conclusions in January 1953.

Project Sign was dismantled and became Project Grudge at the end of 1948. Angered by the low quality of investigations by Grudge, the Air Force Director of Intelligence reorganized it as Project Blue Book in late 1951, placing Ruppelt in charge. J. Allen Hynek, a trained astronomer who served as a scientific advisor for Project Blue Book, was initially skeptical of UFO reports, but eventually came to the conclusion that many of them could not be satisfactorily explained and was highly critical of what he described as "the cavalier disregard by Project Blue Book of the principles of scientific investigation". Leaving government work, he founded the privately funded CUFOS, to whose work he devoted the rest of his life. Other private groups studying the phenomenon include the MUFON, a grassroots organization whose investigator's handbooks go into great detail on the documentation of alleged UFO sightings.

USAF Regulation 200-2 (1953–1954) 

Air Force Regulation 200-2, issued in 1953 and 1954, defined an Unidentified Flying Object ("UFOB") as "any airborne object which by performance, aerodynamic characteristics, or unusual features, does not conform to any presently known aircraft or missile type, or which cannot be positively identified as a familiar object." The regulation also said UFOBs were to be investigated as a "possible threat to the security of the United States" and "to determine technical aspects involved." The regulation went on to say that "it is permissible to inform news media representatives on UFOB's when the object is positively identified as a familiar object" but added: "For those objects which are not explainable, only the fact that ATIC [Air Technical Intelligence Center] will analyze the data is worthy of release, due to many unknowns involved."

Blue Book and the Condon Committee (1968–1970) 

A public research effort conducted by the Condon Committee for the USAF and published as the Condon Report arrived at a negative conclusion in 1968. Blue Book closed down in 1970, using the Condon Committee's negative conclusion as a rationale, thus ending official Air Force UFO investigations. However, a 1969 USAF document, known as the Bolender memo, along with later government documents, revealed that non-public U.S. government UFO investigations continued after 1970. The Bolender memo first stated that "reports of unidentified flying objects that could affect national security ... are not part of the Blue Book system," indicating that more serious UFO incidents already were handled outside the public Blue Book investigation. The memo then added, "reports of UFOs which could affect national security would continue to be handled through the standard Air Force procedures designed for this purpose." 

In the late 1960s a chapter on UFOs in the Space Sciences course at the U.S. Air Force Academy gave serious consideration to possible extraterrestrial origins. When word of the curriculum became public, the Air Force in 1970 issued a statement to the effect that the book was outdated and cadets instead were being informed of the Condon Report's negative conclusion.

Controversy surrounded the report, both before and after its release. It has been observed that the report was "harshly criticized by numerous scientists, particularly at the powerful AIAA ... [which] recommended moderate, but continuous scientific work on UFOs." In an address to the AAAS, James E. McDonald said he believed science had failed to mount adequate studies of the problem and criticized the Condon Report and earlier studies by the USAF as scientifically deficient. He also questioned the basis for Condon's conclusions and argued that the reports of UFOs have been "laughed out of scientific court". J. Allen Hynek, an astronomer who worked as a USAF consultant from 1948, sharply criticized the Condon Committee Report and later wrote two nontechnical books that set forth the case for continuing to investigate UFO reports.

Ruppelt recounted his experiences with Project Blue Book, a USAF investigation that preceded Condon's.

FOIA release of documents in 1978
According to a 1979 New York Times report, "records from the C.I.A., the F.B.I. and other Federal agencies" ("about 900 documents — nearly 900 pages of memos, reports and correspondence") obtained in 1978 through the Freedom of Information Act request, indicate that "despite official pronouncements for decades that U.F.O.'s were nothing more than misidentified aerial objects and as such were no cause for alarm ... the phenomenon has aroused much serious behind‐the‐scenes concern" in the US government. In particular, officials were concerned over the "approximately 10%" of UFO sightings which remained unexplained, and whether they might be Soviet aircraft and a threat to national security.  Officials were concerned about the "risk of false alerts", of "falsely identifying the real as phantom”, and of mass hysteria caused by sightings. In 1947, Brigadier General George F. Schulgen of Army Air Corps Intelligence, warned “the first reported sightings might have been by individuals of Communist sympathies with the view to causing hysteria and fear of a secret Russian weapon.”

White House statement of November 2011 
In November 2011, the White House released an official response to two petitions asking the U.S. government to acknowledge formally that aliens have visited this planet and to disclose any intentional withholding of government interactions with extraterrestrial beings. According to the response: 

The response further noted that efforts, like SETI and NASA's Kepler space telescope and Mars Science Laboratory, continue looking for signs of life. The response noted "odds are pretty high" that there may be life on other planets but "the odds of us making contact with any of them—especially any intelligent ones—are extremely small, given the distances involved."

ODNI report 2021
On June 25, 2021, the Office of the Director of National Intelligence released a report on UAPs. The report found that the UAPTF was unable to identify 143 objects spotted between 2004 and 2021. The report said that 18 of these featured unusual movement patterns or flight characteristics, adding that more analysis was needed to determine if those sightings represented "breakthrough" technology. The report said that "some of these steps are resource-intensive and would require additional investment." The report did not link the sightings to extraterrestrial life.

Uruguay (c. 1989)

The Uruguayan Air Force has conducted UFO investigations since 1989 and reportedly analyzed 2,100 cases of which they regard approximately 2% as lacking explanation.

Europe

France (1977–2008) 

In March 2007, the French space agency CNES published an archive of UFO sightings and other phenomena online.

French studies include GEPAN/SEPRA/GEIPAN within CNES (French space agency), the longest ongoing government-sponsored investigation. About 22% of the 6,000 cases studied remain unexplained. The official opinion of GEPAN/SEPRA/GEIPAN has been neutral, stating on their FAQ page that their mission is fact-finding for the scientific community, not rendering an opinion. They add they can neither prove nor disprove the Extraterrestrial Hypothesis (ETH), but their Steering Committee's clear position is that they cannot discard the possibility that some fraction of the very strange 22% of unexplained cases might be due to distant and advanced civilizations. 

Possibly their bias may be indicated by their use of the terms "PAN" (French) or "UAP" (English equivalent) for "Unidentified Aerospace Phenomenon" (whereas "UAP" is normally used by English organizations stands for "Unidentified Aerial Phenomenon", a more neutral term). In addition, the three heads of the studies have gone on record in stating that UFOs were real physical flying machines beyond our knowledge or that the best explanation for the most inexplicable cases was an extraterrestrial one. In 2007, the CNES's own report stated that, at that time, 28% of sightings remained unidentifed.

In 2008, Michel Scheller, president of the Association Aéronautique et Astronautique de France (3AF), created the Sigma Commission. Its purpose was to investigate UFO phenomena worldwide. A progress report published in May 2010 stated that the central hypothesis proposed by the COMETA report is perfectly credible. In December 2012, the final report of the Sigma Commission was submitted to Scheller. Following the submission of the final report, the Sigma2 Commission is to be formed with a mandate to continue the scientific investigation of UFO phenomena.

Italy (1933–2005) 

Alleged UFO sightings gradually increased since the war, peaking in 1978 and 2005. The total number of sightings since 1947 are 18,500, of which 90% are identifiable.

United Kingdom (1951–2009) 

The UK's Flying Saucer Working Party published its final report in June 1951, which remained secret for over fifty years. The Working Party concluded that all UFO sightings could be explained as misidentifications of ordinary objects or phenomena, optical illusions, psychological misperceptions/aberrations, or hoaxes. The report stated: "We accordingly recommend very strongly that no further investigation of reported mysterious aerial phenomena be undertaken, unless and until some material evidence becomes available."

Eight file collections on UFO sightings, dating from 1978 to 1987, were first released on May 14, 2008, to The National Archives by the Ministry of Defence (MoD). Although kept secret from the public for many years, most of the files have low levels of classification and none are classified Top Secret. 200 files are set to be made public by 2012. The files are correspondence from the public sent to the British government and officials, such as the MoD and Margaret Thatcher. The MoD released the files under the Freedom of Information Act due to requests from researchers. These files include, but are not limited to, UFOs over Liverpool and Waterloo Bridge in London.

On October 20, 2008, more UFO files were released. One case released detailed that in 1991 an Alitalia passenger aircraft was approaching London Heathrow Airport when the pilots saw what they described as a "cruise missile" fly extremely close to the cockpit. The pilots believed a collision was imminent. UFO expert David Clarke says this is one of the most convincing cases for a UFO he has come across.

A secret study of UFOs was undertaken for the Ministry of Defence between 1996 and 2000 and was code-named Project Condign. The resulting report, titled "Unidentified Aerial Phenomena in the UK Defence Region", was publicly released in 2006, but the identity and credentials of whoever constituted Project Condign remains classified. The report confirmed earlier findings that the main causes of UFO sightings are misidentification of man-made and natural objects. The report noted: "No artefacts of unknown or unexplained origin have been reported or handed to the UK authorities, despite thousands of Unidentified Aerial Phenomena reports. There are no SIGINT, ELINT or radiation measurements and little useful video or still IMINT." 

It concluded: "There is no evidence that any UAP, seen in the UKADR [UK Air Defence Region], are incursions by air-objects of any intelligent (extraterrestrial or foreign) origin, or that they represent any hostile intent." A little-discussed conclusion of the report was that novel meteorological plasma phenomenon akin to ball lightning are responsible for "the majority, if not all" of otherwise inexplicable sightings, especially reports of black triangle UFOs.

On December 1, 2009, the Ministry of Defence quietly closed down its UFO investigations unit. The unit's hotline and email address were suspended by the MoD on that date. The MoD said there was no value in continuing to receive and investigate sightings in a release, stating that "in over fifty years, no UFO report has revealed any evidence of a potential threat to the United Kingdom. The MoD has no specific capability for identifying the nature of such sightings. There is no Defence benefit in such investigation and it would be an inappropriate use of defence resources. Furthermore, responding to reported UFO sightings diverts MoD resources from tasks that are relevant to Defence." The Guardian reported that the MoD claimed the closure would save the Ministry around £50,000 a year. The MoD said it would continue to release UFO files to the public through The National Archives.

UFO reports, Parliamentary questions, and letters from members of the public were released on August 5, 2010, to the UK National Archives. "In one letter included in the files, a man alleges Churchill ordered a coverup of a WW II-era UFO encounter involving the Royal Air Force".

Studies
Critics argue that all UFO evidence is anecdotal and can be explained as prosaic natural phenomena. Defenders of UFO research counter that knowledge of observational data, other than what is reported in the popular media, is limited in the scientific community and further study is needed. Studies have established that the majority of UFO observations are misidentified conventional objects or natural phenomena—most commonly aircraft, balloons including sky lanterns, satellites, and astronomical objects such as meteors, bright stars and planets. A small percentage are hoaxes. 

Fewer than 10% of reported sightings remain unexplained after proper investigation and therefore can be classified as unidentified in the strictest sense. According to Steven Novella, proponents of the extraterrestrial hypothesis (ETH) suggest these unexplained reports are of alien spacecraft, however the null hypothesis cannot be excluded; that these reports are simply other more prosaic phenomena that cannot be identified due to lack of complete information or due to the necessary subjectivity of the reports. Novella says that instead of accepting the null hypothesis, UFO enthusiasts tend to engage in special pleading by offering outlandish, untested explanations for the validity of the ETH, which violate Occam's razor.

Scientific

Historically, ufology has not been considered credible in mainstream science. The scientific community has generally deemed that UFO sightings are not worthy of serious investigation except as a cultural artifact. 

Studies of UFOs rarely appear in mainstream scientific literature. When asked, some scientists and scientific organizations have pointed to the end of official governmental studies in the U.S. in December 1969, following the statement by the government scientist Edward Condon that further study of UFOs could not be justified on grounds of scientific advancement.

Status as a pseudoscience

Jacques Vallée, a scientist and ufologist, claimed there were deficiencies in most UFO research, including government studies. He criticized the mythology and cultism often associated with UFO sightings, but despite the challenges, Vallée contended that several hundred professional scientists — a group both he and Hynek termed "the invisible college" — continued to study UFOs quietly on their own time.

Studies
UFOs have become a prevalent theme in modern culture, and the social phenomena have been the subject of academic research in sociology and psychology.

Sturrock panel categorization

Besides anecdotal visual sightings, reports sometimes include claims of other kinds of evidence, including cases studied by the military and various government agencies of different countries (such as Project Blue Book, the Condon Committee, the French GEPAN/SEPRA, and Uruguay's current Air Force study).

A comprehensive scientific review of cases where physical evidence was available was carried out by the 1998 Sturrock panel, with specific examples of many of the categories listed below.
 Radar contact and tracking, sometimes from multiple sites. These have included military personnel and control tower operators, simultaneous visual sightings, and aircraft intercepts. One such example was the mass sightings of large, silent, low-flying black triangles in 1989 and 1990 over Belgium, tracked by NATO radar and jet interceptors, and investigated by Belgium's military (included photographic evidence). Another famous case from 1986 was the Japan Air Lines flight 1628 incident over Alaska investigated by the Federal Aviation Administration (FAA).
 Photographic evidence, including still photos, movie film, and video.
 Claims of physical trace of landing UFOs, including ground impressions, burned or desiccated soil, burned and broken foliage, magnetic anomalies, increased radiation levels, and metallic traces. (See, e. g. Height 611 UFO incident or the 1964 Lonnie Zamora's Socorro, New Mexico encounter of the USAF Project Blue Book cases.) A well-known example from December 1980 was the USAF Rendlesham Forest incident in England. Another occurred in January 1981 in Trans-en-Provence and was investigated by GEPAN, then France's official government UFO-investigation agency. Project Blue Book head Edward J. Ruppelt described a classic 1952 CE2 case involving a patch of charred grass roots.
 Physiological effects on people and animals including temporary paralysis, skin burns and rashes, corneal burns, and symptoms superficially resembling radiation poisoning, such as the Cash-Landrum incident in 1980.
 Animal/cattle mutilation cases, which some feel are also part of the UFO phenomenon.
 Biological effects on plants such as increased or decreased growth, germination effects on seeds, and blown-out stem nodes (usually associated with physical trace cases or crop circles)
 Electromagnetic interference (EM) effects. A famous 1976 military case over Tehran, recorded in CIA and DIA classified documents, was associated with communication losses in multiple aircraft and weapons system failure in an F-4 Phantom II jet interceptor as it was about to fire a missile on one of the UFOs.
 Apparent remote radiation detection, some noted in FBI and CIA documents occurring over government nuclear installations at Los Alamos National Laboratory and Oak Ridge National Laboratory in 1950, also reported by Project Blue Book director Edward J. Ruppelt in his book.
 Claimed artifacts of UFOs themselves, such as 1957, Ubatuba, Brazil, magnesium fragments analyzed by the Brazilian government and in the Condon Report and by others. The 1964 Lonnie Zamora incident also left metal traces, analyzed by NASA. A more recent example involves a teardrop-shaped object recovered by Bob White and was featured in a television episode of UFO Hunters but was later found to be accumulated waste metal residue from a grinding machine.
 Angel hair and angel grass, possibly explained in some cases as nests from ballooning spiders or chaff.

Scientific skepticism

A scientifically skeptical group that has for many years offered critical analyses of UFO claims is the Committee for Skeptical Inquiry (CSI). One example is the response to local beliefs that "extraterrestrial beings" in UFOs were responsible for crop circles appearing in Indonesia, which the government and the National Institute of Aeronautics and Space (LAPAN) described as "man-made". Thomas Djamaluddin, research professor of astronomy and astrophysics at LAPAN stated: "We have come to agree that this 'thing' cannot be scientifically proven. Scientists have put UFOs in the category of pseudoscience."

Governmental

UFOs have been the subject of investigations by various governments who have provided extensive records related to the subject. Many of the most involved government-sponsored investigations ended after agencies concluded that there was no benefit to continued investigation. These same negative conclusions also have been found in studies that were highly classified for many years, such as the UK's Flying Saucer Working Party, Project Condign, the U.S. CIA-sponsored Robertson Panel, the U.S. military investigation into the green fireballs from 1948 to 1951, and the Battelle Memorial Institute study for the USAF from 1952 to 1955 (Project Blue Book Special Report No. 14).

Some public government reports have acknowledged the possibility of the physical reality of UFOs, but have stopped short of proposing extraterrestrial origins, though not dismissing the possibility entirely. Examples are the Belgian military investigation into large triangles over their airspace in 1989–1991 and the 2009 Uruguayan Air Force study conclusion (see below).

Claims by military, government, and aviation personnel
In 2007, former Arizona governor Fife Symington claimed he had seen "a massive, delta-shaped craft silently navigate over Squaw Peak, a mountain range in Phoenix, Arizona" in 1997.
Apollo 14 astronaut Dr. Edgar Mitchell claimed he knew of senior government employees who had been involved in "close encounters", and because of this, he has no doubt that aliens have visited Earth.

In May 2019, The New York Times reported that American Navy fighter jets had several instances of unidentified instrumentation and tracking data while conducting exercises off the eastern seaboard of the United States from the summer of 2014 to March 2015. The Times published a cockpit instrument video which appeared to show an object moving at high speed near the ocean surface as it appeared to rotate, and objects that appeared capable of high acceleration, deceleration and maneuverability. In two separate incidents, a pilot reported his cockpit instruments locked onto and tracked objects but he was unable to see them through his helmet camera. In another encounter, flight instruments recorded an image described as a sphere encasing a cube between two jets as they flew about 100 feet apart. The Pentagon officially released these videos on April 27, 2020. The United States Navy has said there have been "a number of reports of unauthorized and/or unidentified aircraft entering various military-controlled ranges and designated air space in recent years".

In March 2021, news media announced a comprehensive report is to be compiled of UFO events accumulated by the United States over the years.

On April 12, 2021, the Pentagon confirmed the authenticity of pictures and videos gathered by the Unidentified Aerial Phenomena Task Force (UAPTF), purportedly showing "pyramid shaped objects" hovering above the USS Russell in 2019, off the coast of California, with spokeswoman Susan Gough saying "I can confirm that the referenced photos and videos were taken by Navy personnel. The UAPTF has included these incidents in their ongoing examinations." 

In May 2021, military pilots recalled their related encounters, along with camera and radar support, including one pilot's account noting that such incidents occurred "every day for at least a couple of years", according to an interview broadcast on the news program, 60 Minutes (16 May 2021). Science writer and skeptic Mick West suggested the image was the result of an optical effect called a bokeh which can make out of focus light sources appear triangular or pyramidal due to the shape of the aperture of some lenses.

On June 25, 2021, U.S. Defense and intelligence officials released the Pentagon UFO Report on what they know about a series of unidentified flying objects that have been seen by American military pilots. NASA Administrator Bill Nelson said that the UFO sightings by pilots "may not be extraterrestrial."

In December 2021, further official governmental investigations into UAPs and related, along with annual unclassified reports presented to Congress, have been authorized and funded. Some have raised concerns about the new investigations.

Conspiracy theories 

UFOs are sometimes an element of conspiracy theories in which governments are allegedly intentionally "covering up" the existence of aliens by removing physical evidence of their presence or even collaborating with extraterrestrial beings. There are many versions of this story; some are exclusive, while others overlap with various other conspiracy theories.

In the U.S., an opinion poll conducted in 1997 suggested that 80% of Americans believed the U.S. government was withholding such information. Various notables have also expressed such views. Some examples are astronauts Gordon Cooper and Edgar Mitchell, Senator Barry Goldwater, Vice Admiral Roscoe H. Hillenkoetter (the first CIA director), Lord Hill-Norton (former British Chief of Defense Staff and NATO head), the 1999 French COMETA study by various French generals and aerospace experts, and Yves Sillard (former director of CNES, new director of French UFO research organization GEIPAN).

It has also been suggested, by a few paranormal authors, that all or most human technology and culture is based on extraterrestrial contact (see also ancient astronauts).

"Disclosure" advocates  
In May 2001, a press conference was held at the National Press Club in Washington, D.C., by an organization called the Disclosure Project, featuring twenty persons including retired Air Force and FAA personnel, intelligence officers and an air traffic controller. They all gave a brief account of their claims that evidence of UFOs was being suppressed and said they would be willing to testify under oath to a Congressional committee. According to a 2002 report in the Oregon Daily Emerald, Disclosure Project founder Steven M. Greer is an "alien theorist" who claims "proof of government coverup" consisting of 120 hours of testimony from various government officials on the topic of UFOs, including astronaut Gordon Cooper.

On September 27, 2010, a group of six former USAF officers and one former enlisted Air Force man held a press conference at the National Press Club in Washington, D.C., on the theme "U.S. Nuclear Weapons Have Been Compromised by Unidentified Aerial Objects" in which they claimed they had witnessed UFOs hovering near missile sites and even disarming the missiles.

From April 29 to May 3, 2013, the Paradigm Research Group held the "Citizen Hearing on Disclosure" at the National Press Club. The group paid former U.S. Senator Mike Gravel and former Representatives Carolyn Cheeks Kilpatrick, Roscoe Bartlett, Merrill Cook, Darlene Hooley, and Lynn Woolsey $20,000 each to hear testimony from a panel of researchers which included witnesses from military, agency, and political backgrounds.

Fringe
The void left by the lack of institutional or scientific study has given rise to independent researchers and fringe groups, including the National Investigations Committee on Aerial Phenomena (NICAP) in the mid-20th century and, more recently, the Mutual UFO Network (MUFON) and the Center for UFO Studies (CUFOS). The term "Ufology" is used to describe the collective efforts of those who study reports and associated evidence of unidentified flying objects.

Private
Some private studies have been neutral in their conclusions but argued that the inexplicable core cases call for continued scientific study. Examples are the Sturrock panel study of 1998 and the 1970 AIAA review of the Condon Report.

Ufology

Ufology is a neologism describing the collective efforts of those who study UFO reports and associated evidence.

Researchers

Sightings

Organizations

In popular culture

UFOs have constituted a widespread international cultural phenomenon since the 1950s. Gallup Polls rank UFOs near the top of lists for subjects of widespread recognition. In 1973, a survey found that 95 percent of the public reported having heard of UFOs, whereas only 92 percent had heard of U.S. President Gerald Ford in a 1977 poll taken just nine months after he left the White House. 

A 1996 Gallup Poll reported that 71 percent of the United States population believed the U.S. government was covering up information regarding UFOs. A 2002 Roper Poll for the Sci-Fi Channel found similar results, but with more people believing UFOs are extraterrestrial craft. In that latest poll, 56 percent thought UFOs were real craft and 48 percent that aliens had visited the Earth. Again, about 70 percent felt the government was not sharing everything it knew about UFOs or extraterrestrial life.

Another effect of the flying saucer type of UFO sightings has been Earth-made flying saucer craft in space fiction, for example the United Planets Cruiser C57D in Forbidden Planet (1956), the Jupiter2 in Lost in Space, and the saucer section of the USS Enterprise in Star Trek. UFOs and extraterrestrials have been featured in many movies.

The intense secrecy surrounding the secret Nevada base, known as Area 51, has made it the frequent subject of conspiracy theories and a central component of UFO folklore. In July 2019, more than 2 million people responded to a joke proposal to storm Area 51 which appeared in an anonymous Facebook post. Two music festivals in rural Nevada, "AlienStock" and "Storm Area 51 Basecamp", were subsequently organized to capitalize on the popularity of the original Facebook event.

Notes

References

Bibliography

General

 Bullard, Thomas; (2012). The Myth and Mystery of UFOs. Lawrence: University of Kansas. .
  Many classic cases and UFO history provided in great detail; highly documented.
  Non-sensational but fair treatment of contemporary UFO legend and lore in N. America, including the so-called "contactee cults". The author traveled the United States with his camera and tape recorder and directly interviewed many individuals.
 
 
 Greer, Steven M.; (2001). Disclosure. Crozer: Crossing Point. .
  Well-organized, exhaustive summary and analysis of 746 unexplained NICAP cases out of 5000 total cases—a classic.
  Another exhaustive case study, more recent UFO reports.
  Skeptical but balanced analysis of 1300 CUFOS UFO cases.
 
  Analysis of 640 high-quality cases through 1969 by UFO legend Hynek.
 
  (associated article)
 
 
 
 
 
 Mitchell, Edgar; (2008). The Way of the Explorer. Franklin Lakes: Career Press. .
 
 
 
 
 
  Revised edition of The UFO Verdict.
 
  Sturrock panel report on physical evidence.

History

  Reports from the UK government files.
  Dolan is a professional historian.
 
  Many UFO documents.
  Many UFO documents.
 
  Update of Above Top Secret with new cases and documents
 
 
  UFO historical review, case studies, review of hypotheses, recommendations.
 
 
  A UFO classic by insider Ruppelt, the first head of the USAF Project Blue Book.

Psychology

Technology

 
  Analysis of UFO technology by pioneering NACA/NASA aerospace engineer.

Skepticism

 
 
 (Appendix A)

External links

 "Government Reports on UFOs" from the Government Information Library at the University of Colorado Boulder''
 "CIA's Role in the Study of UFOs, 1947–90"  by Gerald K. Haines, Central Intelligence Agency
 "UFOs: Fact or Fiction?" Declassified CIA documents from the 1940s through the early 1990s.
 "UFO Reports in the UK" from 1997 to 2009 by the Ministry of Defence
 "Newly released UFO files from the UK government" at The National Archives
 "Canada's UFOs: The Search for the Unknown", a virtual museum exhibition by the Library and Archives Canada
 Declassified files on UFOs from many countries
 Declassified video – Chilean UAP event of November 11, 2014 (official; video (9:59))
 An astrophysicist's view of UFOs (Adam Frank; NYT; May 30, 2021) 
 A list of skeptical resources (astronomer Andrew Fraknoi)
 UFO Explanations (videos; scientist Mick West)
 Some UAPs may be laser-generated holograms? (WSJ; July 29, 2021).
 UAPs need a high-resolution image (Avi Loeb; Scientific American; August 2, 2021).
 .

 
 
 
Articles containing video clips